Earl Dewey Kunz (December 25, 1898 – April 14, 1963 in Sacramento, California), nicknamed "Pinches", was a professional baseball pitcher who spent one season in Major League Baseball. In total, Kunz spent 13 season in professional baseball, the majority of those in the Pacific Coast League.

Early life 
Kunz was born in Sacramento, California on December 25, 1898. Kunz was nicknamed "Pinches" and "Pinch." As a kid, he played sandlot ball with future major leaguer Kettle Wirts.

Professional career

Sacramento Senators 
In 1920, Kunz began his professional career with the Sacramento Senators. That season, he went 3–11 with a 4.78 earned run average (ERA) in 39 games. His second season, Kunz went 14–12 with a 3.79 ERA in 50 games. He led all Senators pitchers in games played (50), and was second in bases on balls (walks) allowed (103).

References

External links 
  

Pittsburgh Pirates players
Major League Baseball pitchers
Baseball players from Sacramento, California
1898 births
1963 deaths